Édouard Husson (born 1969), is a French historian, university professor, and former CEO of ESCP Europe. He was elected in 2009 as Professor of Contemporary History at the University of Picardy. From 2009 to 2010, he was responsible for the humanities and social sciences at Valérie Pécresse. On 11 August 2010, he became Vice-Chancellor of the Universities of Paris until September 2012, when he was appointed Director of the ESCP Europe.

Selected publications 
 L'Europe contre l'amitié franco-allemande, des malentendus à la discorde, Édouard Husson, Éditions François-Xavier de Guibert, 1998.
 Une histoire de France, Quelques leçons du passé pour comprendre les impasses d'aujourd'hui, Édouard Husson, Éditions François-Xavier de Guibert, 2001.
 Les conséquences économiques et politiques de la paix, réédition conjointe de John Maynard, Les conséquences économiques de la paix, 1919 et de Jacques Bainville, Les conséquences politiques de la paix, 1920, préface d'Édouard Husson, Paris, Éditions Gallimard, 2002.
 Les complaisantes. Jonathan Littell et l'écriture du mal, Édouard Husson, Éditions François-Xavier de Guibert, 2007.

References

External links

Living people
1969 births
20th-century French historians
21st-century French historians